The 1971 San Diego Padres season was the third season in franchise history.

Offseason
 October 20, 1970: Sonny Ruberto was sent by the Padres to the Cincinnati Reds in a conditional deal.
 November 30, 1970: Bill Laxton was drafted by the Padres from the Philadelphia Phillies in the rule 5 draft.

Regular season

Opening Day starters
Ollie Brown
Dave Campbell
Chris Cannizzaro
Nate Colbert
Tommy Dean
Cito Gaston
Tom Phoebus
Ed Spiezio
Larry Stahl

Season standings

Record vs. opponents

Notable transactions
 June 11, 1971: Al Santorini was traded by the Padres to the St. Louis Cardinals for Leron Lee and Fred Norman.

Roster

Player stats

Batting

Starters by position
Note: Pos = Position; G = Games played; AB = At bats; H = Hits; Avg. = Batting average; HR = Home runs; RBI = Runs batted in

Other batters
Note: G = Games played; AB = At bats; H = Hits; Avg. = Batting average; HR = Home runs; RBI = Runs batted in

Pitching

Starting pitchers
Note: G = Games pitched; IP = Innings pitched; W = Wins; L = Losses; ERA = Earned run average; SO = Strikeouts

Other pitchers
Note: G = Games pitched; IP = Innings pitched; W = Wins; L = Losses; ERA = Earned run average; SO = Strikeouts

Relief pitchers
Note: G = Games pitched; W = Wins; L = Losses; SV = Saves; ERA = Earned run average; SO = Strikeouts

Award winners

1971 Major League Baseball All-Star Game

Farm system

LEAGUE CHAMPIONS: Tri-City

References

External links
 1971 San Diego Padres at Baseball Reference
 1971 San Diego Padres at Baseball Almanac

San Diego Padres seasons
San Diego Padres season
San Diego Padres